Dominik Koepfer was the defending champion but chose not to defend his title.

Zizou Bergs won the title after defeating Jack Sock 7–6(9–7), 2–6, 7–6(8–6) in the final.

Seeds

Draw

Finals

Top half

Bottom half

References

External links
Main draw
Qualifying draw

Ilkley Trophy - 1
2022 men's singles